The Eula is a tributary of the River Wyhra in northwestern Saxony in Germany.

Course 

The Eula rises in the Eulawäldchen ("Little Eula Wood") south of the Geithain parish of Wickershain. It crosses the municipality of Geithain, flowing through the lido of Oberfürstenteich. Beyond Geithain it collects the Salzbach from the left and the Kalkbach from the right. After passing through Niedergräfenhain, Frauendorf and Hermsdorf it reaches Prießnitz. Here it is joined from the right by the Frankenheimer Bach and the Little (Kleine) Eula. Next it flows through Flößberg and Beucha to Kitzscher, collecting the Heinersdorfer Bach and  Steingrundbach before reaching Beucha.

Whilst the Eula has been straightened for long stretches, there is a near natural reach between Beucha and Kitzscher with meanders, sand banks and kolks.

After collecting the Jordanbach in Kitzscher it turns from its hitherto predominantly northwesterly course to head in a southwestern to western direction.

Tributaries 

 Salzbach
 Kalkbach
 Frankenheimer Bach
 Kleine Eula
 Heinersdorfer Bach
 Steingrundbach
 Jordanbach

Villages on the Eula 

 Wickershain (Geithain)
 Geithain
 Niedergräfenhain (Geithain)
 Frauendorf (Frohburg)
 Hermsdorf (Frohburg)
 Prießnitz (Frohburg)
 Flößberg (Frohburg)
 Beucha (Bad Lausick)
 Kitzscher
 Braußwig (Kitzscher)
 Dittmannsdorf (Kitzscher)
 Eula (Borna)
 Haubitz (Borna)
 Großzössen (Neukieritzsch)

See also 
List of rivers of Saxony

References

External links 
 River description by the Leipzig Angling Union for the upper reaches and for the lower reaches of the Eula.

Rivers of Saxony
Rivers of Germany